The Brighton by-election was a Parliamentary by-election held on 5 April 1905. The constituency returned one Member of Parliament (MP) to the House of Commons of the United Kingdom, elected by the first past the post voting system.

It was one of only eight ministerial by-elections in the UK not to be retained by the incumbent.

Vacancy
Gerald Loder had been Conservative MP for the seat of Brighton since the 1889 Brighton by-election. He vacated his seat upon appointment as Lord Commissioner of the Treasury so as to seek re-election.

Electoral history
Brighton returned two Members of Parliament to the House of Commons of the United Kingdom, elected by the first past the post voting system. The seat had been Conservative since they gained it in 1885. They easily held both seats at the last election:

Candidates
The Conservatives re-selected 44-year-old Gerald Loder to defend the seat. He was private secretary to the President of the Local Government Board (Charles Ritchie) from 1888 to 1892 and to Lord George Hamilton (the Secretary of State for India) from 1896 to 1901.

The local Liberal Association selected 42-year-old Ernest Villiers as their candidate. He was ordained as an Anglican priest. After three years as a curate in Halifax, he became rector of Haveringland, Norfolk. He resigned from holy orders to pursue a political career.

Campaign
Polling Day was fixed for 5 April 1905.

Result
The Liberals gained the seat from the Conservatives:

Aftermath
At the following General Election, the Liberals gained the other seat from the Conservatives, the result was:

References

1905 elections in the United Kingdom
1905 in England
20th century in Sussex
Politics of Brighton and Hove
By-elections to the Parliament of the United Kingdom in East Sussex constituencies